Esteban Arze is a province in Cochabamba Department, Bolivia. Its capital is Tarata. Many people from the Esteban Arze province (Tarata and Arbieto) have migrated abroad,mainly to Argentina and to the Washington DC area (Arlington county, Fairfax county, and Alexandria Virginia, and Montgomery County Maryland.) https://pulitzercenter.org/reporting/only-bridge-matters-now

Subdivision 

The province is divided into four municipalities which are further subdivided into cantons. The municipalities with their seats are:

Places of interest 
 Laguna La Angostura

Holidays and Feasts 
The province's primary feast is in honor of Saint Severin, which is celebrated the last Sunday of November in the town of Tarata.

See also 
 Atuq Wachana
 Jatun Mayu
 Jatun Urqu
 Jatun Urqu (Matarani)
 Jaya Mayu
 Misuk'ani
 Puka Qawiña
 Pukara

External links 
 Map of Esteban Arze Province
 www.ine.gov.bo

Provinces of Cochabamba Department